Georni Gregorio Jaramillo Cáceres (born 6 March 1989) is a Venezuelan athlete competing in the decathlon. He won the gold medal at the 2018 South American Games in a new national record of 7977 points.

International competitions

Personal bests
Outdoor
100 metres – 10.66 (+0.5 m/s, Cochabamba 2018)
400 metres – 47.92 (Cochabamba 2018)
1500 metres – 4:45.94 (Asunción 2017)
110 metres hurdles – 13.95 (-1.0 m/s, Cochabamba 2018)
400 metres hurdles – 50.78 (Caracas 2010)
High jump – 1.90 (Barquisimeto 2011)
Pole vault – 4.60 (Barinas 2017)
Long jump – 7.71 (+0.9 m/s, Cochabamba 2018)
Shot put – 16.10 (Barquisimeto 2018)
Discus throw – 46.78 (Caracas 2017)
Javelin throw – 63.61 (Caracas 2017)
Decathlon – 8048 (Barquisimeto 2018)

References

1989 births
Living people
Venezuelan decathletes
Athletes (track and field) at the 2011 Pan American Games
Athletes (track and field) at the 2019 Pan American Games
Athletes (track and field) at the 2018 South American Games
South American Games gold medalists for Venezuela
South American Games silver medalists for Venezuela
South American Games medalists in athletics
Pan American Games competitors for Venezuela
South American Games gold medalists in athletics
Competitors at the 2018 Central American and Caribbean Games
20th-century Venezuelan people
21st-century Venezuelan people